Natural England is a non-departmental public body in the United Kingdom sponsored by the Department for Environment, Food and Rural Affairs. It is responsible for ensuring that England's natural environment, including its land, flora and fauna, freshwater and marine environments, geology and soils, are protected and improved. It also has a responsibility to help people enjoy, understand and access the natural environment.

Natural England focuses its activities and resources on four strategic outcomes:
 a healthy natural environment
 enjoyment of the natural environment
 sustainable use of the natural environment
 a secure environmental future

Roles and responsibilities
As a non-departmental public body (NDPB), Natural England is independent of government. However, the Secretary of State for Environment, Food & Rural Affairs has the legal power to issue guidance to Natural England on various matters, a constraint that was not placed on its predecessor NDPBs.

Its powers include defining ancient woodlands, awarding grants, designating Areas of Outstanding Natural Beauty and Sites of Special Scientific Interest, managing certain national nature reserves, overseeing access to open country and other recreation rights, and enforcing the associated regulations. It is also responsible for the administration of numerous grant schemes and frameworks that finance the development and conservation of the natural environment, for example environmental stewardship, the Countryside Stewardship Scheme, environmentally sensitive areas, and the Access to Nature Scheme. It has been severely criticised recently  by badger protection lobbyists for allegedly ignoring scientific data and granting extended badger cull licences to DEFRA. 

Natural England's latest corporate plan sets out its goals and detailed objectives. It is responsible for the delivery of some of Defra's public service agreements (e.g. reversing the long-term decline in the number of farmland birds by 2020 and improving public access to the countryside).

Natural England takes its finance, human resources and estates services from the Defra Shared Services organisation. Information technology services are outsourced to IBM.

History
Natural England was established on 1 October 2006 by the Natural Environment and Rural Communities Act 2006, which implemented the recommendations of a rural review by The Baron Haskins of Skidby. It was formed by the amalgamation of three founder bodies:
 Countryside Agency, the landscape, access and recreation elements
 English Nature
 Rural Development Service, the environmental land management functions of Department for Environment, Food and Rural Affairs (Defra)

It received the powers of the founder bodies.

Natural England joined the 10:10 project in 2009 in a bid to reduce its own carbon footprint. One year later they announced that they had reduced their carbon emissions (according to 10:10's criteria) by 13%.

In 2008, Sir Martin Doughty, the Chairman of Natural England, warned the Prime Minister of the potential danger of genetically modified crops.  However, in 2012, Poul Christensen, CBE, the next Chairman of Natural England, said that middle England should embrace new technologies like GM crops as long as there were adequate testing and safeguards.

As a Public Body Natural England has been subject to pay Freezes and pay restrictions following the 2008 financial crash, and is likely to be subject to the 2020 three year pay freeze also. Natural England staff have now been subject to pay freezes and 1% pay increases. Staff and Unions representing staff have voiced concerns over the duration of these pay restraints and issues including equality and disparity between Public body pay increases.

The following take from 2 December 2020 Research briefing on Public body pay.

"In 2010, the Coalition Government announced a two-year pay freeze from 2011/12. Following cuts to local government funding, local government workers were subject to a three-year pay freeze.

From 2013/14 to 2017/18 public sector pay awards were capped at an average of 1%.

This policy was lifted in 2017 and from 2018/19 to 2020/21 the parts of the public sector that are covered by the PRBs received pay rises above 2%.

The Trades Union Congress has criticised the constraints that were in place from 2010, arguing that they led to a "decade of lost pay".

The severity of the cuts by the Conservative government to Natural England in particular have been reported in the media including The Guardian newspaper.

There also exists pay disparities between the staff who came from original bodies which vested to Natural England - The Rural Development Service, English Nature and the Countryside Agency.
On this matter, and the pay freeze and pay reductions over 10 years Unions representing Natural England staff have threatened strike action.

Activities

State of the Natural Environment
In May 2008, Natural England published a report, State of the Natural Environment, which brought together statistics and facts about England's environment. The report was intended to be used by environmental organisations as a benchmark and source for policy development. It complements reports on different topics produced by other organisations:
 on environmental facts and figures, by the Environment Agency
 on heritage counts, by the English Heritage
 on the state of the UK's birds, by the Royal Society for the Protection of Birds
 on the state of Britain's butterflies, by the Butterfly Conservation

Green exercise
Natural England funded eight pilot green exercise projects through local regional partnerships. These projects increased levels of physical activity and people's connections to their local green spaces. However, it was not clear whether these projects really changed people's long-term attitudes.

Green infrastructure
Natural England is promoting the concept of green infrastructure as a way to deliver a wide range of benefits for people and the natural environment together. It believes that green infrastructure should be delivered via the spatial planning system, as an integral part of new development everywhere, and also form a key part of proposals to regenerate existing urban areas.

Natural England is working with partners in the growth areas, growth points and proposed eco-towns to prepare and implement green infrastructure strategies and demonstrate good practice on the ground.

Natural England is one of the steering group partners of Neighbourhoods Green, a green Infrastructure partnership initiative which works with social landlords and housing associations to highlight the importance of, and raise the overall quality of, design and management for open and green space in social housing.

Legal challenge 
Natural England was challenged in High Court in 2006 by Peter Boggis, a pensioner who protected his house from erosion. Natural England claimed that as the site of Boggis's house, at Easton Bavents north of Southwold on the Suffolk coast was a Site of Special Scientific Interest (SSSI), the protection went against the scientific community's interests. Natural England lost the case in 2009, when Mr. Justice Blair, the brother of the former Prime Minister, ruled that Mr. Boggis' "human predicament" was more important than the site's SSSI status. Natural England won the subsequent appeal in October 2009.

Removal of the General Licence 
On 23 April 2019, Natural England (NE) announced that it was revoking three general licences in England for controlling certain wild birds using firearms. The removal was without consultation or communication. These licences covered 16 species of birds including several species of crow, gull and pigeon, along with non-native species such as Canada goose and sacred ibis. Natural England took the decision following a legal challenge by the environmental group Wild Justice which questioned the legality of the general licences. This rendered farmers temporarily unable to kill these species without applying for individual licences.

On 26 April 2019 NE issued the first of a series of replacement licences, covering the killing of carrion crows, and announced its intention to issue further licences in the coming weeks. Defra issued further licences for the majority of the species covered by the original general licences, apart from Eurasian jay and rook.

At NE's request, the Environment Secretary Michael Gove took over responsibility for the general licences from Natural England on 4 May 2019.

See also
 Ancient woodland
 England Coast Path
 National Character Area
 National nature reserves in England
 Sir Martin Doughty – first Chair of Natural England 2006–2009
 Tony Juniper – current Chair of Natural England

References

External links 

Natural Environment and Rural Communities Act 2006

2006 establishments in England
Agricultural organisations based in England
Conservation in England
Department for Environment, Food and Rural Affairs
English coast and countryside
Environmental organizations established in 2006
Interested parties in planning in England
Non-departmental public bodies of the United Kingdom government
Organisations based in York